, Mandarin Airlines offers scheduled and charter services to over 30 destinations.

List

References

Lists of airline destinations